Wendy Blair (September 15, 1938, Flushing, New York – April 14, 2009, North Hollywood, California) was an American television producer.

She was the first female junior executive at CBS. She worked as an associate producer and producer on various television series, including, most notably, Three's Company and its spinoffs, The Ropers and Three's A Crowd. She worked for with the Smothers Brothers as their manager of business operations for many years until the beginning of 2009, shortly before she died. She also worked with Dick Clark Productions and Sid and Marty Krofft Enterprises.

Death
Wendy Blair died from cancer in 2009, aged 70. She was survived by a son, a daughter, a granddaughter, and a sister.

References

External links
TV.com bio
Notice of Wendy Blair's death at www.congoo.com/news

1938 births
2009 deaths
American television executives
Women television executives
Television producers from New York City
American women television producers
Deaths from cancer in California
People from Greater Los Angeles
People from Flushing, Queens
20th-century American women
21st-century American women